The Stadion im. Braci Czachorów, also known as the Stadion Miejski w Radomiu, is located in Radom, Poland. It is currently used mostly for association football matches and is the home ground of Radomiak Radom. Its reconstruction started in May 2017, and is not over yet.

The stadium's capacity is to be 15,000. During the construction of the facility, Radomiak, who competes in the Ekstraklasa, will be playing its home matches at the Marshall Józef Piłsudski Stadium at 9 Narutowicza Street.

The old stadium that was located on this site was built in 1925.

References 

Sport in Radom
Stadium
Radom
Buildings and structures in Radom
Sports venues in Masovian Voivodeship